Henricus macrocarpana is a species of moth of the  family Tortricidae. It is found in the United States, where it has been recorded from Nevada and California.

The wingspan is about 22 mm. Adults have been recorded on wing in January, March, May, June, August and from October to November.

References

Moths described in 1895
Henricus (moth)